Jaypee Punjab Warriors (abbreviated as JPW) is a field hockey team based in Chandigarh, Punjab that plays in the Hockey India League. It is owned by Jaypee Group. Former Australian coach Barry Dancer serves as the head coach for the team while former India player Jagbir Singh has been taken on board as an advisor and coaching staff.

Franchisee Details

Ownership
Jaiprakash Associates Ltd. (JAL) or Jaypee Group is the owner of the franchise. Jaypee Group is a well diversified infrastructural industrial conglomerate in India. Over the decades, it has maintained its salience with leadership in its chosen line of businesses — Engineering and Construction, Cement, Power, Hospitality, Real Estate, Expressways, Agri Business as well as Sport. It has developed India’s premier motorsports destination – Buddh International Circuit – at Greater Noida near New Delhi.

2017 squad

Statistics

Fixtures and Results

2013

 Goals For: 29 (2.07 per match)
 Goals Against: 34 (2.43 per match)
 Most Goals: 4 (Overall: 11th)
 Dharamvir Singh
 Jamie Dwyer 
 Malak Singh
 S. V. Sunil

2014

2015

References

External links
 Official website

Hockey India League teams
Field hockey in Punjab, India
2012 establishments in Punjab, India
Sport in Jalandhar
Sports clubs established in 2012
Indian field hockey clubs
Jaypee Group